Benoît Ntambue Badiashile Mukinayi Baya (born 26 March 2001) is a French professional footballer who plays as a defender for Premier League club Chelsea and the France national team.

Early life
Benoît Ntambue Badiashile Mukinayi Baya was born on 26 March 2001 in Limoges, Haute-Vienne. He is of Congolese descent.

Club career

Monaco
On 5 February 2018, Badiashile signed his first professional contract with Monaco. On 11 November, he made his professional debut in a 4–0 Ligue 1 loss to Paris Saint-Germain.

Chelsea
On 5 January 2023, Badiashile signed for Premier League club Chelsea on a seven-and-a-half-year contract for a transfer fee reported by The Guardian to be £32.7 million (€37 million). On 15 January 2023, Badiashile made his debut for Chelsea, as he started against Crystal Palace in the Premier League. The French defender played the entire game and earned his new club a clean sheet as Chelsea won 1–0.

International career
Badiashile is a youth international for France, having been a part of a number of under-16 to under-21 teams since 2016.

Badiashile received his first call-up to the France national team for two UEFA Nations League matches against Austria and Denmark in September 2022.

Personal life
Badiashile is the younger brother of Loïc Badiashile, who is also a professional footballer.

Career statistics

Club

International

Honours
Individual
IFFHS Men's Youth (U20) World Team: 2021

References

External links

Profile at the Chelsea F.C. website

2001 births
Living people
Sportspeople from Limoges
Footballers from Nouvelle-Aquitaine
French footballers
Association football defenders
AS Monaco FC II players
AS Monaco FC players
Chelsea F.C. players
Championnat National 2 players
Ligue 1 players
Premier League players
France youth international footballers
France under-21 international footballers
France international footballers
Black French sportspeople
French expatriate footballers
Expatriate footballers in England
French expatriate sportspeople in England
French sportspeople of Democratic Republic of the Congo descent